Jamie Smith (born February 14, 2001) is a Canadian curler from Sudbury, Ontario. She currently plays third on Team Isabelle Ladouceur. In 2022, she played third for the Canadian junior team at the 2022 World Junior Curling Championships.

Career
Smith made her first national appearance at the 2018 Canadian U18 Curling Championships after posting an 8–0 record at the 2018 U18 Northern Ontario Girls Provincial with the Bella Croisier rink. The rink would go on to post a 4–2 round robin record, but would fail to carry momentum into the championship round and would drop their next two games, missing the playoffs.

In 2019 Smith would once again reach the national stage this time at the 2019 Canada Winter Games. After finishing first in the round robin with a 9–1 record, the rink would advance directly to the semi-final where they would defeat Nova Scotia's Cally Moore 6–5 and then go on to capture the gold medal after defeating Manitoba's Hayley Bergman 8–3. In the same year, Smith would go on to win back-to-back provincial titles, capturing the 2019 U18 Northern Ontario Girls Provincial and qualifying for the 2019 Canadian U18 Curling Championships. The rink would once again advance to the championship round after a 5–1 round robin record, this time reaching the playoffs and defeating New Brunswick's Melodie Forsythe 7–4 in the semi-final and Ontario's Emily Deschenes 6–2 in the final to win the gold medal.

Personal life
Smith is currently a Financial Mathematics student at Wilfrid Laurier University.

Teams

References

Curlers from Northern Ontario
2001 births
Living people
Sportspeople from Greater Sudbury
Wilfrid Laurier University alumni